Antechnology is an EP released by American alternative metal band Pressure 4-5. It was released independently on Dripping Records in 1999. After the success of this EP, the band was picked up by DreamWorks Records to go on to release their first and final full-length album.

Music
The EP is noted for having a more aggressive sound compared to the band's major label debut, Burning the Process. In a 2001 interview, vocalist Adam Rich remarked, "[With] Antechnology we did not know what we wanted to do. We knew that we wanted to play heavy music but I hadn't gotten into melody and things like that. I really didn't think about song writing. We had a goal just to write as many songs as we possibly could and come up with as much new material as possible. [But] that is how you evolve as a band, to keep writing and playing - and those [Antechnology] were just the songs that came out of it."

Track listing

References

1999 EPs
Pressure 4-5 albums